Wayne Velicer (March 4, 1944 – October 15, 2017) was an American psychologist known for his research in quantitative and health psychology. He taught at the University of Rhode Island from 1973 until his death in 2017. He worked with James O. Prochaska to help to found the University of Rhode Island's Cancer Prevention Research Center, of which he subsequently served as co-director.

Honors and awards
In 2004, Velicer was one of six University of Rhode Island faculty to be named an ISI Highly Cited Researcher. In 2013, he received the Samuel J. Messick Distinguished Scientific Contributions Award from Division 5 of the American Psychological Association. In 2018, he was posthumously inducted into the University of Rhode Island's Lifetime Service Society.

References

External links

1944 births
2017 deaths
People from Green Bay, Wisconsin
University of Rhode Island faculty
University of Wisconsin–Oshkosh alumni
20th-century American psychologists
Purdue University alumni
Quantitative psychologists